The Tomb of Wais is a holy shrine on the top of a mountain northwest of Kermanshah. The building dates back to the Seljuq period.

References

External links
 Shrine of Wais in Kermanshah

Buildings and structures in Kermanshah Province
Mausoleums in Iran
Tourist attractions in Kermanshah Province
Mausoleums in Kermanshah Province